Ethan Cairns (born 17 December 2004) is a Scottish professional footballer who currently plays as a striker for Inverness Caledonian Thistle in the Scottish Championship.

Career 
Cairns came through the Inverness Caledonian Thistle Academy, before being sent out on loan to Strathspey Thistle, Fort William, and finally Forres Mechanics before being recalled from his Forres loan due to an injury crisis going on at Inverness.

On 2 January 2023, Cairns made his debut for Inverness, coming on in a 6–1 win over Cove Rangers in the Scottish Championship. Cairns scored his first goal for Inverness in a 2–2 league win over Greenock Morton immediately after being subbed on for fellow academy graduate, Daniel MacKay.

References 

Living people
2004 births
Inverness Caledonian Thistle F.C. players
Strathspey Thistle F.C. players
Fort William F.C. players
Forres Mechanics F.C. players